Kormi-ye Bala (also Romanized as Kormī-ye Bālā; also known as Kormī) is a village in Piveshk Rural District, Lirdaf District, Jask County, Hormozgan Province, Iran. At the 2006 census, its population was 133, in 26 families.

References 

Populated places in Jask County